The Kamensk-Uralsky constituency (No.169) is a Russian legislative constituency in Sverdlovsk Oblast. The constituency covers southeastern corner of Sverdlovsk Oblast. Until 2007 the constituency covered Yekaterinburg's suburbs and exurbs, however after 2015 redistricting it shedded its northern part to Beryozovsky and Asbest constituency, while taking Chkalovsky District of Yekaterinburg from Verkh-Isetsky constituency.

Members elected

Election results

1993

|-
! colspan=2 style="background-color:#E9E9E9;text-align:left;vertical-align:top;" |Candidate
! style="background-color:#E9E9E9;text-align:left;vertical-align:top;" |Party
! style="background-color:#E9E9E9;text-align:right;" |Votes
! style="background-color:#E9E9E9;text-align:right;" |%
|-
|style="background-color:"|
|align=left|Sergey Mikheyev
|align=left|Independent
|
|27.46%
|-
|style="background-color:"|
|align=left|Viktor Yakimov
|align=left|Independent
| -
|23.42%
|-
| colspan="5" style="background-color:#E9E9E9;"|
|- style="font-weight:bold"
| colspan="3" style="text-align:left;" | Total
| 
| 100%
|-
| colspan="5" style="background-color:#E9E9E9;"|
|- style="font-weight:bold"
| colspan="4" |Source:
|
|}

1995

|-
! colspan=2 style="background-color:#E9E9E9;text-align:left;vertical-align:top;" |Candidate
! style="background-color:#E9E9E9;text-align:left;vertical-align:top;" |Party
! style="background-color:#E9E9E9;text-align:right;" |Votes
! style="background-color:#E9E9E9;text-align:right;" |%
|-
|style="background-color:"|
|align=left|Malik Gaisin
|align=left|Independent
|
|21.68%
|-
|style="background-color:#00A200"|
|align=left|Viktor Yakimov
|align=left|Transformation of the Fatherland
|
|14.88%
|-
|style="background-color:"|
|align=left|Sergey Mikheyev (incumbent)
|align=left|Independent
|
|14.85%
|-
|style="background-color:"|
|align=left|Sergey Izmodenov
|align=left|Independent
|
|9.42%
|-
|style="background-color:#1C1A0D"|
|align=left|Lyudmila Gayday
|align=left|Forward, Russia!
|
|6.04%
|-
|style="background-color: " |
|align=left|Pavel Dudorov
|align=left|Kedr
|
|5.29%
|-
|style="background-color:"|
|align=left|Sergey Bukhovtsev
|align=left|Liberal Democratic Party
|
|4.43%
|-
|style="background-color:"|
|align=left|Aleksandr Rozhuk
|align=left|Independent
|
|3.63%
|-
|style="background-color:"|
|align=left|Azat Mukhametzyanov
|align=left|Independent
|
|3.06%
|-
|style="background-color:"|
|align=left|Valeria Chermeninova
|align=left|Independent
|
|2.80%
|-
|style="background-color:#000000"|
|colspan=2 |against all
|
|11.92%
|-
| colspan="5" style="background-color:#E9E9E9;"|
|- style="font-weight:bold"
| colspan="3" style="text-align:left;" | Total
| 
| 100%
|-
| colspan="5" style="background-color:#E9E9E9;"|
|- style="font-weight:bold"
| colspan="4" |Source:
|
|}

1999

|-
! colspan=2 style="background-color:#E9E9E9;text-align:left;vertical-align:top;" |Candidate
! style="background-color:#E9E9E9;text-align:left;vertical-align:top;" |Party
! style="background-color:#E9E9E9;text-align:right;" |Votes
! style="background-color:#E9E9E9;text-align:right;" |%
|-
|style="background-color:"|
|align=left|Georgy Leontyev
|align=left|Independent
|
|39.21%
|-
|style="background-color:"|
|align=left|Malik Gaisin (incumbent)
|align=left|Independent
|
|13.80%
|-
|style="background-color:"|
|align=left|Grigory Kasperovich
|align=left|Independent
|
|7.63%
|-
|style="background-color:"|
|align=left|Yury Raptanov
|align=left|Independent
|
|5.75%
|-
|style="background-color:#E98282"|
|align=left|Galina Shcherbakova
|align=left|Women of Russia
|
|4.29%
|-
|style="background-color:"|
|align=left|Pavel Putin
|align=left|Independent
|
|4.10%
|-
|style="background-color:"|
|align=left|Sergey Martyushov
|align=left|Yabloko
|
|3.98%
|-
|style="background-color:#3B9EDF"|
|align=left|Sergey Mikheyev
|align=left|Fatherland – All Russia
|
|2.48%
|-
|style="background-color:#C21022"|
|align=left|Pavel Sverak
|align=left|Party of Pensioners
|
|1.69%
|-
|style="background-color:#084284"|
|align=left|Ilya Zatsarinny
|align=left|Spiritual Heritage
|
|0.46%
|-
|style="background-color:#020266"|
|align=left|Artyom Satovsky
|align=left|Russian Socialist Party
|
|0.37%
|-
|style="background-color:#000000"|
|colspan=2 |against all
|
|14.30%
|-
| colspan="5" style="background-color:#E9E9E9;"|
|- style="font-weight:bold"
| colspan="3" style="text-align:left;" | Total
| 
| 100%
|-
| colspan="5" style="background-color:#E9E9E9;"|
|- style="font-weight:bold"
| colspan="4" |Source:
|
|}

2003

|-
! colspan=2 style="background-color:#E9E9E9;text-align:left;vertical-align:top;" |Candidate
! style="background-color:#E9E9E9;text-align:left;vertical-align:top;" |Party
! style="background-color:#E9E9E9;text-align:right;" |Votes
! style="background-color:#E9E9E9;text-align:right;" |%
|-
|style="background-color:#FFD700"|
|align=left|Georgy Leontyev (incumbent)
|align=left|People’s Party
|
|32.41%
|-
|style="background-color:"|
|align=left|Aleksandr Revyakin
|align=left|Independent
|
|32.41%
|-
|style="background-color:"|
|align=left|Konstantin Tsybko
|align=left|Independent
|
|9.74%
|-
|style="background-color:"|
|align=left|Yury Tsybakin
|align=left|United Russia
|
|6.40%
|-
|style="background-color:"|
|align=left|Lyudmila Yelizarova
|align=left|Communist Party
|
|4.38%
|-
|style="background-color:"|
|align=left|Aleksandr Leontyev
|align=left|Independent
|
|3.48%
|-
|style="background-color:"|
|align=left|Andrey Misyura
|align=left|Independent
|
|0.40%
|-
|style="background-color:#000000"|
|colspan=2 |against all
|
|9.60%
|-
| colspan="5" style="background-color:#E9E9E9;"|
|- style="font-weight:bold"
| colspan="3" style="text-align:left;" | Total
| 
| 100%
|-
| colspan="5" style="background-color:#E9E9E9;"|
|- style="font-weight:bold"
| colspan="4" |Source:
|
|}

2016

|-
! colspan=2 style="background-color:#E9E9E9;text-align:left;vertical-align:top;" |Candidate
! style="background-color:#E9E9E9;text-align:leftt;vertical-align:top;" |Party
! style="background-color:#E9E9E9;text-align:right;" |Votes
! style="background-color:#E9E9E9;text-align:right;" |%
|-
| style="background-color: " |
|align=left|Lev Kovpak
|align=left|United Russia
|
|37.51%
|-
| style="background-color: " |
|align=left|Yury Zlydnikov
|align=left|A Just Russia
|
|14.75%
|-
|style="background-color:"|
|align=left|Konstantin Subbotin
|align=left|Liberal Democratic Party
|
|10.08%
|-
|style="background-color:"|
|align=left|Aleksey Parfenov
|align=left|Communist Party
|
|9.41%
|-
|style="background-color:"|
|align=left|Vladimir Gerasimenko
|align=left|Party of Growth
|
|4.72%
|-
|style="background-color: " |
|align=left|Dmitry Golovin
|align=left|Yabloko
|
|4.67%
|-
|style="background-color: " |
|align=left|Konstantin Karashevich
|align=left|Communists of Russia
|
|3.91%
|-
|style="background-color:"|
|align=left|Valery Ivanov
|align=left|Rodina
|
|3.70%
|-
|style="background-color: " |
|align=left|Sergey Pakulov
|align=left|The Greens
|
|2.05%
|-
|style="background-color:"|
|align=left|Lev Iofe
|align=left|Patriots of Russia
|
|1.49%
|-
|style="background-color:"|
|align=left|Anatoly Koromyslov
|align=left|People's Freedom Party
|
|1.31%
|-
| colspan="5" style="background-color:#E9E9E9;"|
|- style="font-weight:bold"
| colspan="3" style="text-align:left;" | Total
| 
| 100%
|-
| colspan="5" style="background-color:#E9E9E9;"|
|- style="font-weight:bold"
| colspan="4" |Source:
|
|}

2021

|-
! colspan=2 style="background-color:#E9E9E9;text-align:left;vertical-align:top;" |Candidate
! style="background-color:#E9E9E9;text-align:left;vertical-align:top;" |Party
! style="background-color:#E9E9E9;text-align:right;" |Votes
! style="background-color:#E9E9E9;text-align:right;" |%
|-
|style="background-color: " |
|align=left|Lev Kovpak (incumbent)
|align=left|United Russia
|
|30.10%
|-
|style="background-color:"|
|align=left|Andrey Gorislavtsev
|align=left|A Just Russia — For Truth
|
|21.68%
|-
|style="background-color:"|
|align=left|Aleksandr Ivachev
|align=left|Communist Party
|
|18.43%
|-
|style="background-color:"|
|align=left|Stanislav Masorov
|align=left|New People
|
|6.03%
|-
|style="background-color:"|
|align=left|Aleksandr Kaptyug
|align=left|Liberal Democratic Party
|
|4.83%
|-
|style="background-color: "|
|align=left|Vladimir Taskayev
|align=left|Party of Pensioners
|
|4.71%
|-
|style="background-color: " |
|align=left|Nikolay Gavrilov
|align=left|Yabloko
|
|3.06%
|-
|style="background-color:"|
|align=left|Andrey Merkulov
|align=left|Rodina
|
|2.55%
|-
|style="background-color: "|
|align=left|Andrey Khabarov
|align=left|Russian Party of Freedom and Justice
|
|2.32%
|-
| colspan="5" style="background-color:#E9E9E9;"|
|- style="font-weight:bold"
| colspan="3" style="text-align:left;" | Total
| 
| 100%
|-
| colspan="5" style="background-color:#E9E9E9;"|
|- style="font-weight:bold"
| colspan="4" |Source:
|
|}

Notes

References

Russian legislative constituencies
Politics of Sverdlovsk Oblast